A Scatter of Light is a young adult coming-of-age story written by Malinda Lo and published on October 4, 2022 by Dutton Books for Young Readers. A standalone companion book to Lo's previous novel, Last Night at the Telegraph Club, it tells the story of Aria West as she explores her sexuality and the LGBT culture in San Francisco.

Reception 
Kirkus Reviews called A Scatter of Light "[a] contemporary queer coming-of-age story steeped in pivotal events", in reference to the novel's setting of 2013 and the legalization of same-sex marriage in California. While the publication praised the setting, calling it "richly detailed", it noted that the story would have been improved if it focused more on the personal lives of the main characters. Publishers Weekly, which gave the novel a starred review, called it an "expansive tale of yearning, self-discovery, and first love."

A review for The Horn Book Magazine commented on the connection between Aria West and the main character from Last Night at the Telegraph Club, saying "readers will be delighted to discover the connection between [the two]." The reviewer also praised Malinda Lo's take on the topics explored in the novel, and called it "an intimate, exhilarating story of [first] love." Molly Horan, for The Booklist, commended the author for her use of the Tumblr website in the novel, which made it feel "wonderfully early 2010s" while the main character's exploration of her own sexuality felt "timeless".

References 

2022 American novels
American LGBT novels
American bildungsromans
Novels set in the 2010s
Novels set in San Francisco
Novels with transgender themes
E. P. Dutton books
2020s LGBT novels